The INAS 350 is an Indian naval air squadron based at INS Dega, Visakhapatnam.

References 

Aircraft squadrons of the Indian Navy
Naval units and formations of India